Hare Ness is a headland landform along the North Sea coastline a few miles south of Aberdeen, Scotland.

History
Hare Ness is situated several kilometres west of the ancient Causey Mounth trackway, which road was built to make passable this only available medieval route from coastal points south from Stonehaven to Aberdeen. This ancient passage specifically connected the River Dee crossing (where the present Bridge of Dee is situated) via Portlethen Moss, Muchalls Castle and Stonehaven to the south. The route was that taken by William Keith, 7th Earl Marischal and the Marquess of Montrose when they led a Covenanter army of 9,000 men in the battle of the Civil War in 1639.

See also
Brown Jewel
Grim Brigs

References

Headlands of Scotland
Landforms of Aberdeenshire